Luxo Jr. is a 1986 American computer-animated short film produced and released by Pixar. Written and directed by John Lasseter, the two-minute short film revolves around one larger and one smaller desk lamp. The larger lamp, named Luxo Sr., looks on while the smaller, "younger" Luxo Jr. plays exuberantly with a ball to the extent that it accidentally deflates. Luxo Jr. was Pixar's first animation after Ed Catmull and John Lasseter left Industrial Light & Magic's computer division of Cinetron Computer Systems. The film is the source of Luxo Jr., the mascot of Pixar.

Lasseter aimed to finish the short film for the 1986 SIGGRAPH, an annual computer graphics conference attended by thousands of industry professionals. The film would come from his experiments with modeling his Luxo lamp. Lasseter worked to improve the story within the allotted two minutes. In animation, the film demonstrates the use of shadow maps within the rendering software. Lasseter applied the classic animation principles popularized by Disney's Nine Old Men to convey the lamps' emotions. Catmull and Lasseter worked around the clock, and Lasseter even took a sleeping bag into work and slept under his desk, ready to work early the next morning. Ultimately, the film took four and a half months to be completed.

The short film was finished in time for it to be shown at SIGGRAPH. Before the film finished playing, the audience had already risen in applause. Luxo Jr. is regarded as a breakthrough in the animation industry as a whole, changing traditionalists' interpretation of computer animation. The short was the first work of animation to use procedural animation, the software written by Eben Ostby. It received an Academy Award nomination for Best Animated Short Film, becoming the first CGI film nominated for an Academy Award.

The soundtrack music is an uncredited edit of three tunes on Brian Bennett's album Counterpoint In Rhythm: Finesse, Quicksilver, and Chateau Latour.

In 2014, Luxo Jr. was deemed "culturally, historically, or aesthetically significant" by the Library of Congress and selected for preservation in the United States National Film Registry.

Plot

In a dark room, a large illuminated balanced-arm desk lamp named Luxo Sr. sees a small yellow ball with a blue stripe and a red star on the front roll-up to him. He eyes the ball curiously and pushes it away, but the ball comes back to him. He pushes it away again, but it rolls past him as Luxo Jr., his happy and excited son, hops over and plays with the ball. Luxo Jr. then balances himself on top of the ball and bounces on it excessively, causing it to deflate. Luxo Jr. flips the deflated ball onto its side and looks up at Luxo Sr., who gently admonishes his son. Luxo Jr. then hops offscreen in shame but is later seen playing with a beach ball. Luxo Sr. looks at the camera, then shakes his head in embarrassment.

Background
The Graphics Group, which was one-third of the Computer Division of Lucasfilm, had been associating with Industrial Light & Magic on computer-generated graphics in the early 1980s. In 1984, the group produced an animated short film titled The Adventures of André & Wally B., which premiered at the annual SIGGRAPH conference to great fanfare. The group, which numbered 40 individuals, was spun out as a corporation in February 1986 with investment by Steve Jobs shortly after he left Apple Computer. Jobs paid $5 million to George Lucas for technology rights and put them and $5 million cash as capital into the company. A factor contributing to Lucas' sale was an increase in cash flow difficulties following his 1983 divorce, which coincided with the sudden dropoff in revenues from Star Wars licenses following the release of Return of the Jedi. The newly independent company was headed by Dr. Edwin Catmull as president and Dr. Alvy Ray Smith as Executive Vice President. They were joined on the Board of Directors by Steve Jobs who was chairman.

Pixar's small animation department—consisting of Lasseter, plus the part-time supporting efforts of several graphics scientists—was never meant to generate any revenue as far as Jobs was concerned. Catmull and Smith justified its existence on the basis that more films that were shown at SIGGRAPH like The Adventures of André and Wally B. would promote the company's computers. The group had no film at SIGGRAPH the preceding year, its last year under Lucas's wing, apart from a stained-glass knight sequence they produced for Young Sherlock Holmes. Catmull was determined that Pixar would have a film to show at its first SIGGRAPH as an independent company in August 1986. Luxo Jr. was produced by Pixar employee John Lasseter as a demonstration of the Pixar Image Computer's capabilities.

Two other short animations produced by two of the company's graphics experts were in production during the time in which Luxo Jr. was conceived. Bill Reeves, who was interested in algorithms to re-create the turbulence of ocean waves, made Flags and Waves, with waves reflecting a sunset and lapping against the shore. Eben Ostby, a Brown architecture major turned graphics programmer, made Beach Chair, starring a chair that walked across the sand and nervously approached the water, dipped its front legs in just far enough to test the temperature, then scurried along. Reeves and Ostby also assisted Lasseter with model making and rendering on the short film.

Production
Lasseter's student film at CalArts, The Lady and the Lamp (1979), applied Walt Disney's observation that giving lifelike qualities to inanimate objects held comic potential. Luxo Jr. displayed a further insight, however: that inanimate objects as characters held the potential for dramatic value as well. The film would come from Lasseter's experiments with modeling his Luxo lamp. He had felt an inspiration strike when fellow employee Tom Porter brought his infant son Spencer to work one day and Lasseter, playing with the child, became fascinated with his proportions. A baby's head was huge compared with the rest of its body, Lasseter realized. It struck Lasseter as humorous and he began to wonder what a young lamp would look like. He fiddled with the dimensions of all the parts of his Luxo model—all but the bulb since lightbulbs come from a store and don't grow, he reasoned—and he emerged with a second character, Luxo Jr.

Lasseter initially intended Luxo Jr. as a plotless character study. When he showed some early tests at an animation festival in Brussels, Belgium, respected Belgian animator Raoul Servais exhorted him, "No matter how short it is, it should have a beginning, a middle, and an end. Don't forget the story." Lasseter protested that the film would be too short for a story. "You can tell a story in ten seconds", Servais responded. Lasseter was convinced. He devised a simple plotline in which the two lamps would play a game of catch with an inflated ball; Luxo Jr. would then approach the ball, hop onto it, bounce until the ball popped under him, and show dejection as the parent lamp looked on. Finally, Luxo Jr. would reappear feeling excited with a new, larger ball. Among the films shown at SIGGRAPH in 1985, Lasseter particularly admired a piece of character animation called Tony de Peltrie, which came from a group at the University of Montreal; it featured a strikingly expressive human character, an aging piano player who entertained while inwardly reflecting on better days, which inspired the film.

Apart from the film's hoped-for promotional value, Catmull and Smith rationalized the project as a test of "self-shadowing" in the rendering software- that is, the ability of objects to shed light and shadows on themselves. Before self-shadowing, CGI shadows were made by adding a flattened and darkened version of the shadowed object.
On the technical level, the film demonstrates the use of shadow maps to simulate the shifting light and shadow given by the animated lamps. The lights and the color surfaces of all the objects are calculated, each using a RenderMan surface shader, not surface textures. The articulation of "limbs" is carefully coordinated, and power cords trail believably behind the moving lamps.

Because time and money were tight, Lasseter reduced the setting to its simplest elements. The background would be plain black and there would be no camera movement. His energies would rather be focused instead on working out techniques based on classic animation principles to convey emotion. Even though the characters were faceless and wordless, Lasseter shaped such subtleties as the speed of the child's hops and the way it carried its head to convey in an instant when the child was feeling joy and when it was feeling sad. At every moment, the parent and child seemed to have a definite frame of mind. On the cinematic level, it demonstrates a simple and entertaining story, including effectively expressive individual characters. Catmull and Lasseter worked around the clock, and Lasseter even took a sleeping bag into work and slept under his desk, ready to work early the next morning.

Release

Luxo Jr., alongside Flags and Waves and Beach Chair, premiered at SIGGRAPH in the Dallas Convention Center Arena, where the audience of six thousand immediately recognized the short film as a breakthrough. Before Luxo Jr. finished playing at SIGGRAPH, the crowd had already risen in applause. "Pixar's marketing department did not go out of its way to point out that none of the film, not a single frame, had been rendered on a Pixar Image Computer", wrote David Price in his book The Pixar Touch. The audience was captivated by the far more realistic look than The Adventures of André and Wally B.. More significant than its photorealism, however, was its emotional realism. "It was perhaps the first computer-animated film that enabled viewers to forget they were watching computer animation", wrote Price.

Afterward, Lasseter saw Jim Blinn, a longtime professional colleague, approaching him, obviously readying a question. Lasseter braced for a question about the shadowing algorithm or some other recondite technical issue that he knew equally little about. Blinn instead asked whether the big lamp was the mother or the father. Although the memories of those involved are now hazy, Lasseter elsewhere referred to the parent lamp as the father. Lasseter then realized that he had succeeded in applying the Disney touch of thought and emotion to his characters.

"Luxo Jr. sent shock waves through the entire industry – to all of the corners for computer and traditional animation. At that time, most traditional artists were afraid of the computer. They did not realize that the computer was merely a different tool in the artist's kit but instead perceived it as a type of automation that might endanger their jobs. Luckily, this attitude changed dramatically in the early '80s with the use of personal computers in the home. The release of our Luxo Jr. [...] reinforced this opinion turnaround within the professional community." – Edwin Catmull, Computer Animation: A Whole New World, 1998.

The short film was released for home video as part of Tiny Toy Stories in 1996, the VHS and DVD releases of Toy Story 2 in 2000, and Pixar Short Films Collection, Volume 1 in 2007.

In 1986, Luxo Jr. received an Academy Award nomination for Best Animated Short Film. It was the first CGI film nominated for an Academy Award. Spinoffs of the short called "Surprise", "Light & Heavy", "Up and Down", and "Front and Back" have appeared on Sesame Street, which are now available on the Pixar Short Films Collection – Volume 1.

Luxo Jr., without his cord, now serves as the mascot for Pixar Animation Studios, in which he appears in its production logo before and after every feature film (except for original printings of Toy Story (1995), where he only appears after the film; the post-2009 prints featured the Pixar logo at the start of the film before transitioning to the opening scene). He hops in from the right, stops next to the letter "I" in "PIXAR". An idea flies into his head. Excited, Luxo Jr. playfully bounces on it until he has completely squashed it down as he did to his rubber ball in the short. He then looks around to check if the letter had been squashed down. As the text "Animation Studios" fades in, then angles his head toward the camera, now resembling a lowercase I, which was the idea he had. At this point, all the light typically fades to black except for his head, which goes out with a click after a moment. Occasionally, the head fades in time with the light—this is usually the case when the logo appears right before a Pixar feature film—but this is exceptional. It was designed by Pete Docter and animated by Hi Tech Toons.

Some variations of this sequence were created for specific Pixar films. For Cars (2006), the message "Celebrating 20 Years" appeared as the background faded out, with Luxo Jr.'s head used as the zero, using the closing version as the base. Pixar was founded in 1986; Cars, released in 2006, marked the studio's 20th anniversary.

In the second trailer for WALL-E (2008), at the end of the film itself, and on the PlayStation 2, PlayStation Portable and PC versions of the video game, Luxo Jr.'s bulb burns out when he turns to look at the camera. WALL-E rolls in from the right, replaces the bulb with an energy-saving fluorescent bulb (in-keeping with the film's environmental themes), and pats Luxo Jr. on the head before going back the way he came. However, he trips over the letter "R" in PIXAR as he goes, so he stops and positions his body to take its place, after which Luxo Jr. looks at the camera. WALL-E slightly peeks his eyes out, and the lights go out normally, except for the trailer. The film concludes with the "BNL" jingle and logo afterward.

In 2008, the Pixar logo was remastered and it was animated and produced by Gini Cruz Santos.

A new variant of the sequence, optimized for 3-D projection, was first played with the 3D version of Up (2009). The same animation as the regular logo plays as normal. However, the camera pans to the right while zooming out from the "P" in the PIXAR letters; therefore Luxo Jr. is seen approaching from the center when he is first seen and is in his usual position near the end. Also, the subtitle (Animation Studios) zooms in as it appears.

Another anniversary variation was created for Cars 2 (2011), with the message "Celebrating 25 Years" appearing as the background faded out. The C appeared in the same position as Luxo Jr.'s head, which subsequently faded away to leave only the text, again celebrating Pixar's anniversary. This variation appears only in theatrical releases of Cars 2. However, in the DVD and Blu-Ray releases and TV airing, the standard logo is seen instead.

On Coco (2017), the last sound is replaced by a bell tolling, which continues into the film's opening.

In Toy Story Toons, Luxo Jr. looks up to the falling curtain, which reveals the title, Woody and Buzz. Both pose as soon as the curtain fell completely.

30th and 35th Anniversary versions were supposed to appear on Finding Dory (2016) and Luca, but they did not make it into the final films.

Yet another variation was used in Incredibles 2 (2018), where Luxo Jr. is colored in black and the background is reddish-yellow to match the Incredibles logo's colors.

In 2019, the Pixar logo was reanimated using the Presto Animation System. The only changes is the base and LED bulb of Luxo Jr., alongside minor color correction.

Another variation of the logo is also seen after the credits of Toy Story 4 (2019) where instead of Luxo Jr., Duke Caboom (voiced by Keanu Reeves) rides in on his motorcycle and bounces the letter "I" down with it and receives a high-five from the Combat Carl Soldier who had missed out on one earlier in the film at which the logo instantly cuts to black (the clap sound substituting for the light clicking off). The start of the movie simply uses the regular sequence. At the end of the regular sequence, it starts to rain. The screen turns dark, with the Luxo Jr.'s light shining through the rain, a la the closing version of the regular sequence, until lightning flashes, transitioning into the opening scene.

At the end of Soul, after Luxo Jr. turns off his bulb, Terry appears. She says "Oi! Movie's over. Go home!" and then disappears.

In Pixar Popcorn, each short featured a variation of the Pixar logo that focuses on Luxo Jr. doing something in relation with popcorn.

Other appearances
In 2012, three design students, Adam Ben-Dror, Shanshan Zhou & Joss Doggett created a real life, animatronic version of Luxo Jr. They called the project Pinokio.

Since the short's release, the ball from the short has appeared in almost every Pixar production to date.
In 1991, a series of four Luxo Jr. shorts were produced for Sesame Street. The shorts produced were "Up & Down", "Front & Back", "Heavy & Light", and "Surprise".
In To Infinity and Beyond!: The Story of Pixar Animation Studios, a book of Pixar's history up through January 2007, film critic Leonard Maltin said that he "like[s] the fact that Luxo [Jr.] still has significance to the people at Pixar", and remarked that it was something like Disney's Mickey Mouse.
The short was later released on November 24, 1999, in theaters with Toy Story 2 (1999). This version is preceded with the modern Pixar logo and the message "In 1986, Pixar Animation Studios produced its first film. This is why we have a hopping lamp in our logo.", replacing the original Pixar logo. This would carry over to the VHS and DVD releases of Toy Story 2 in 2000. There is also a scene in Toy Story 2 where Hamm frantically flicks through TV channels to find a certain commercial. One of the channels is showing Luxo Jr.
In Tin Toy, a picture of Luxo Jr. appears.
In Red's Dream, an older lamp appears.
In the credits of Cars 2 (2011), Luxo Jr. appears.
At Disney California Adventure, an animatronic Luxo Jr. greets people on the way into Pixar Pier and Paradise Gardens Park.
Luxo Jr. also appears in Disney Infinity.
Luxo Sr. also appears a lot in the  Toy Story series although, he is non-anthropomorphic, and is painted red. The red version had also had a cameo in Club Penguin: Elite Penguin Force. Somehow, it later was owned by Bonnie in the Toy Story Toons Hawaiian Vacation. In Toy Story 3 (2010), it is decorated with stickers.
An audio-animatronic version of Luxo Jr. used to appear in Pixar Place at the Disney's Hollywood Studios theme park.
The Pixar logo was parodied by the comedy website CollegeHumor in a short titled "Pixar Intro Parody". The logo plays out as normal but Luxo Jr. kills the letter I. As the other letters mourn the loss of capital I, Luxo Jr. is tried for murder and subsequently sentenced to the electric chair, leaving the other letters of the logo to celebrate his "death".
In The Amazing World of Gumball episode, "The Revolt", during the scene when household objects attack Elmore inhabitants, Luxo Jr. is seen attacking Phil with a Up DVD.
An online animator known as "PixarFan8695" has created a fan YouTube series known as the "Luxo Jr. Short Series" which is about the playful adventures of Luxo Jr.'s exciting life, along with his loving father, Luxo Sr, and his friends.
Luxo Jr. appears as an unlockable character in Lego The Incredibles, who is known simply as "Junior", due to a copyright issue with Luxo ASA, which is unlocked after completing a Family Build of a statue of Luxo Jr. and the Luxo ball.
In one Robot Chicken sketch, known as "Good Cop Bad Lamp", it features Luxo Jr.
In 2001, Nvidia demonstrated the then-new GeForce 3 series graphics processing units with a version of the short rendered in real-time.
In Ralph Breaks the Internet (2018), a giant Luxo Jr. about the Luxo ball appears in Oh My Disney.
In Soul (2020), Luxo Jr. is seen in the Hall of Everything.

Notes

References
 2009 Vintage Books edition: , Excerpt available at Google Books.

External links

Tiny Toy Stories
A special "Where's WALL-E" edition of Why For?, Jim Hill Media
Jacob Jacobsen, Designer of Luxo (or rather Luxor) lamp
Luxo Sr., An Interview with John Lasseter
, An essay about the creation of Luxo Jr.

1986 short films
1980s American animated films
1980s animated short films
1986 computer-animated films
Animated films without speech
American computer-animated films
Films with screenplays by John Lasseter
Pixar short films
Short films directed by John Lasseter
United States National Film Registry films
American animated short films